Chad Green may refer to:
Chad Green (outfielder), retired baseball outfielder
Chad Green (pitcher), baseball pitcher for the New York Yankees